Indapur Assembly constituency is one of the 288 Vidhan Sabha (legislative assembly) constituencies of Maharashtra state, western India. This constituency is located in Pune district, and is one of the 6 vidhan sabha seats which make up Baramati Lok Sabha seat.

Geographical scope
The constituency comprises Indapur taluka. The city of Indapur is located near Bheema river.

Members of Legislative Assembly

References

Assembly constituencies of Pune district
Assembly constituencies of Maharashtra